Kerry or Kerri is both a masculine and feminine English language given name of Gaelic (Irish) origin.

In its original form Ciarraighe (Ciarraí), it denoted the kingdom of Ciar (ciar raighe), Ciar being the son of Fergus mac Róich, who gave his name to County Kerry. Ciarraighe was thus the name of the pre-Gaelic tribe who lived in the area of what is now County Kerry. However, branches of the Ciarraighe were all over Ireland:

 Ciarraige Luachra          - in what is now north County Kerry and Sliabh Luachra, both named after them.
 Ciarraige Cuirche          - due south of what is now Cork City, in Munster.
 Ciarraige Áei              - on the plains of central County Roscommon, in Connacht.
 Ciarraighe Locha na nÁirne - in eastern County Mayo in Connacht.
 Ciarraige Airtech          - on Magh nAirtig (plain of Airtig, northwest County Roscommon, parish of Tibohine. 
 Ciarraige Broengair            - location uncertain. The Múscraige Breogain were found south-west of Cashel, Munster. 
 Ciarraige Choinnend            - location uncertain.
 Ciarraige Trimaige             - location uncertain.
 Ciarraige Aidhne               - in Aidhne, now south County Galway, Connacht.

Notable people with the name

Acting, presenting, and radio 
Kerry Bishé, actress
 Kerry Fox (born 1966), New Zealand actress
 Kerri Green, American actress
 Kerri Kasem, an American radio and television host
 Kerri Kendall, an American model and actress
 Kerri Kenney-Silver, an American comedian, actress, singer and writer
 Kerri-Anne Kennerley, an Australian television presenter
 Kerry LaiFatt, Canadian actress
 Kerry Rossall, American stuntman and actor
 Kerry Shale, Canadian actor, voice artist and writer
 Kerry Washington, American actress

Politics 
 Kerry J. Donley (1956-2022), American politician
 Kerry Healey (born 1960), American politician, former Lieutenant Governor of Massachusetts

Music
 Kerry Alexander, lead singer of the Minnesota-based band Bad Bad Hats
 Kerri Chandler, producer of house music
 Kerry Ellis, an English singer and stage actress
 Kerry Katona, pop singer
 Kerry King, Guitarist for thrash metal band Slayer
 Kerry Livgren, a founding member of the progressive rock band Kansas
 Kerry McGregor (1974–2012), Scottish singer-songwriter and actress

Sport
 Kerry Blackshear Jr. (born 1997), American basketball player in the Israeli Basketball Premier League
 Kerry Brown (wrestler), Canadian professional wrestler
 Kerri Buchberger, Canadian volleyball player
 Kerry Collins, American football player
 Kerri Gallagher (born 1989), American middle-distance runner
Kerry Joyce, South African gymnast, All Africa champion
 Kerry Kittles, American basketball player
 Kerry Ligtenberg, American baseball player
 Kerry O'Brien (athlete), Australian middle-distance runner
 Kerri Pottharst, Australian beach volleyball player
 Kerry Reid, Australian tennis player
 Kerri Strug, American gymnast
 Kerry Von Erich, American professional wrestler
 Kerri Walsh, American beach volleyball player
 Kerry Wood, American baseball player

Other fields
 Kerry Gammill, American comic book artist
 Kerri Greenidge, American historian and academic
 Kerri Hoskins, former glamour model
Kerrie Hughes, New Zealand fashion designer 
 Kerry G. Johnson, graphic designer, caricature artist
 Kerry Joyce, American interior designer and product designer
 Kerry McCluggage, owner and president of Craftsman Films
 Kerry Packer, Australian media magnate
 Kerri Sakamoto, Canadian novelist
 Kerry Mitchell, American artist

Surname
Richard John Kerry (1915–2000), American Foreign Service officer and lawyer, son of  Frederick A. "Fred" Kerry (born Fritz Kohn, 1873– 1921)
 Rosemary Forbes Kerry, one of 11 children of James Grant Forbes of the Protestant Forbes family of China and Boston, wife of Richard John Kerry
 John Kerry, John Forbes Kerry (born December 11, 1943), United States politician and 2004 presidential candidate, son of Richard John Kerry
 Cameron Kerry, Cameron Forbes Kerry (born September 6, 1950), son of Richard John Kerry, American politician
 Charles Kerry, Charles Henry Kerry (3 April 1857 – 26 May 1928), photographer
 Alexandra Kerry, Alexandra Forbes Kerry (born September 5, 1973) is an American filmmaker.
 Richard Kerry,  Richard John Kerry (July 28, 1915 – July 29, 2000)
 Vanessa Kerry, Vanessa Bradford Kerry (born December 31, 1976), American physician and health care administrator

See also 
Carey (surname)

References

English unisex given names
English-language unisex given names
Irish unisex given names
Irish-language unisex given names